Rosy Barsony (1909–1977) was a Hungarian-born dancer, singer and film actress.

Rosy was born Róza Sonnenschein on 5 June 1909 in Budapest. She was a child performer and became a leading operetta soubrette. She began a film career in 1929, and in 1931 she moved to Berlin. Her career flourished: she became the leading lady in the operettas of Paul Abraham and married fellow performer Oskar Dénes. 

As a Jewish woman, she left Germany in 1935, touring in Italy, England and Romania, before returning to Budapest. From 1948, she settled in Vienna, appearing on television as well as on stage at the Stadttheater Klagenfurt and the Seefestspielen Mörbisch.

She died in Vienna on 23 March 1977 and is buried at the Döblinger Cemetery.

Selected filmography
 The Old Scoundrel (1932)
 A Mad Idea (1932)
 A Bit of Love (1932)
 And the Plains Are Gleaming (1933)
 Love Must Be Understood (1933)
 Waltz War (1933)
 Leap into Bliss (1934)
 Ball at the Savoy (1935)
 Roxy and the Wonderteam (1938)

References

Bibliography
 Robert von Dassanowsky. Austrian Cinema: A History. McFarland, 2005.

External links

1909 births
1977 deaths
Hungarian female dancers
20th-century Hungarian women singers
Hungarian film actresses
Hungarian stage actresses
Actresses from Budapest
Hungarian emigrants to Austria